Lawrence W. Kennan (born June 13, 1944) is an American football coach and former player. Kennan was most recently the head football coach for the University of the Incarnate Word from 2012 to 2017.  He was also the head coach at Lamar University from 1979 to 1981 and for the London Monarchs of the World League of American Football (WLAF) in 1991. Kennan served as the executive director of the NFL Coaches Association from 1998 until 2011.

Coaching career
Kennan's coaching career began at his alma mater La Verne in 1966. After a two-year stint at Garden Grove High School, he resumed his collegiate coaching career at Colorado in 1969 and then served as the offensive coordinator at UNLV (1973–1975) and SMU (1976–1978). He was named head football coach at Lamar University in 1979, where he coached the Cardinals for three years.

Kennan joined the professional ranks in 1982 when Tom Flores named him quality control coach on his Los Angeles Raiders staff. The following year, he was promoted to quarterbacks coach and won a Super Bowl ring with them as quarterback coach of the Super Bowl XVIII winning team. He remained with the Raiders for six seasons, before joining the Denver Broncos as the wide receivers coach in 1988. In 1989, Kennan was named the offensive coordinator of the Indianapolis Colts.

After two seasons, he was named head coach of the London Monarchs of the World League of American Football. That year, he led the Monarchs to a 9–1 regular season record and captured the inaugural World Bowl title with a 21–0 victory over the Barcelona Dragons. He returned to the NFL in 1992 when he was named the offensive coordinator and quarterbacks coach of the Seattle Seahawks, where he remained through the 1994 season.

In 1995, he joined Jim E. Mora's staff in New Orleans, where he instructed the Saints tight ends for a year before re-joining the Raiders in 1996. After one season as Oakland's quarterbacks coach, Kennan was hired by Pete Carroll as offensive coordinator of the New England Patriots. After one year there, and now liking how he was being treated, he quit and moved to Washington, D.C., to serve as the first executive director of the NFL Coaches Association.

In December 2011, after 14 years out of coaching, Kennan succeeded Mike Santiago as the head football coach at the University of the Incarnate Word. On November 27, 2017, Kennan was dismissed as Incarnate Word's head football coach after finishing the 2017 campaign with a 1–10 record and a 1–7 mark in Southland Conference play.

Head coaching record

College

Professional

References

1944 births
Living people
Colorado Buffaloes football coaches
Denver Broncos coaches
Incarnate Word Cardinals football coaches
Indianapolis Colts coaches
Lamar Cardinals football coaches
London Monarchs coaches
Los Angeles Raiders coaches
National Football League offensive coordinators
New England Patriots coaches
New Orleans Saints coaches
Oakland Raiders coaches
Seattle Seahawks coaches
Sportspeople from Los Angeles County, California
University of La Verne alumni